Milestone College is a Bengali and English-medium, co-educational private school in Uttara Model Town, Dhaka, Bangladesh. It was founded by Colonel Nuran Nabi (Retd) who was the founding principal of RAJUK Uttara Model College.

Milestone ranked tenth nationally in Higher Secondary Certificate (HSC) examination results in 2014.

References

External links 
 

Educational institutions of Uttara
Schools in Dhaka District
Private schools in Bangladesh